Biestblut - zwei in einem (Ein Gedankenkonstrukt in sieben Szenen) (German: Beast Blood-Two in One; A Thought Construct in Seven Scenes) is the third album by Stillste Stund.

Track listing
 Prolog "Geist-Dämmerung" - 3:02
 Szene 1: Prokreation & Geburt "Vorahnung" - 2:34
 Szene 1: Prokreation & Geburt "Erwachen in der Kälte" – 3:00
 Szene 1: Prokreation & Geburt "Weltwinternacht" – 4:44
 Szene 2: Das Vermächtnis "Treibjagd" – 2:08
 Szene 2: Das Vermächtnis "Fraß oder Fresser" – 3:48
 Szene 2: Das Vermächtnis "Darwin" – 4:58
 Szene 3: Die Wölfe "Gleich dem Ende der Welt" – 2:16
 Szene 3: Die Wölfe "Alphawolf" – 2:42
 Szene 3: Die Wölfe "Sublunaris" – 4:18
 Szene 4: Die Elfen "Tellereisen" – 1:54
 Szene 4: Die Elfen "Spottgesang einer Elfe" – 2:45
 Szene 4: Die Elfen "Wo die Wirklichkeit schweigt" – 6:08
 Szene 5: Der Schläfer "Für die Ewigkeit eines Lidschlags" – 2:52
 Szene 5: Der Schläfer "Galerie der Träume" – 2:32
 Szene 5: Der Schläfer "Nebelland" – 4:49
 Szene 6: Das Gott-Kalkül "Geliebt" – 1:29
 Szene 6: Das Gott-Kalkül "Zweites Erwachen" – 2:55
 Szene 6: Das Gott-Kalkül "Golem" – 5:00
 Szene 7: Reminiszenz & Tod "Entleibung" – 1:40
 Szene 7: Reminiszenz & Tod "Auflösung und Erlösung" – 2:42
 Szene 7: Reminiszenz & Tod "Solar Plexus" – 5:36
 Epilog "Der Gedanke eines anderen" – 2:25

Info
All songs written by Oliver Uckermann, except tracks 7 and 16: lyrics by Birgit Strunz and Oliver Uckermann
Arranged, produced, record and mixed by Oliver Uckermann
Male vocals by Oliver Uckermann
Female vocals on tracks 4, 7, 10, 13, 16 and 22 by Birgit Strunz
Additional female vocals by Inanis Kurzweil
Photography by Norbert Strunz
Album artwork by Birgit Strunz

References
 Biestblut at Musicbrainz.org
 Discography at official website
 Stillste Stund Discography Info

2003 albums
Alice In... albums
Stillste Stund albums